The Women's artistic team all-around event took place on 5 October 2010, at the Indira Gandhi Arena.

Results

References
Reports

Gymnastics at the 2010 Commonwealth Games
2010 in women's gymnastics